"Chuck E.'s in Love" is a song by American singer-songwriter Rickie Lee Jones. Released in 1979 on her eponymous debut album Rickie Lee Jones, the song became her biggest hit, reaching number 4 on the Billboard U.S. Hot 100 list.

"Chuck E.'s in Love" is track 1 on Side One of the Rickie Lee Jones LP, on which it runs 3 minutes and 28 seconds. It is Side A on the single; the B-side is "On Saturday Afternoon in 1963".

Inspiration
Jones and her lover/fellow songwriter Tom Waits spent a lot of time hanging out with their friend Chuck E. Weiss at the seedy Tropicana Motel in Los Angeles. Eventually Weiss, affectionately referred to as "Chuck E.", disappeared. Later Weiss called the apartment where Jones and Waits lived. When Waits took the call, Weiss explained that he was in Denver, and that he had moved there because he had fallen in love with a cousin there. When Waits hung up he announced to Jones, "Chuck E.'s in love". Jones liked the sound of the sentence and wrote a song around it. Although toward the end of "Chuck E.'s in Love" the lyrics state, "Chuck E.'s in love with the little girl singing this song," the twist ending is fictional; Jones was never the girl with whom Chuck E. was in love.

Chart history

Weekly charts

Year-end charts

References

External links
 Lyrics of this song
 

Songs about musicians
1979 songs
1979 debut singles
Song recordings produced by Lenny Waronker
Song recordings produced by Russ Titelman
Warner Records singles
Songs written by Rickie Lee Jones